Manel de la Rosa Mileo (Barcelona, 1961) is a writer and writing teacher at Ateneu Barcelonès, where he currently teaches narrative techniques and novel. He was chosen as New Talent FNAC of Catalan literature in 2012.

Published work 
 2007: L'holandès (Castelló : Ellago) 
 2012: Cada color d'un riu (Barcelona : Edicions del Periscopi)

References

External links 
 Reseña de Núria Dòria a Núvol.com

Novelists from Catalonia
21st-century novelists
Writers from Barcelona
Catalan-language writers
1961 births
Living people